Azad News is a Hindi-language 24/7 news television channel. The channel is a free-to-air. The channel is available across all major cable and DTH platforms as well as online.

References

Hindi-language television channels in India
Television channels and stations established in 2008
Hindi-language television stations
Television channels based in Noida